Gerben de Knegt (born 11 December 1975) is a former professional cyclo-cross racing cyclist and mountain biker from the Netherlands. He was born in Tilburg, North Brabant.

Major results 

2001–2002
 1st  National Cyclo-cross Championships
 1st Centrumcross Surhuisterveen
2004
 1st Stages 1 & 2, TransAlp Challenge
2005–2006
 1st  National Cyclo-cross Championships
 1st Sluitingsprijs Oostmalle, GvA Trofee
 1st Diegem, Superprestige
 1st Cyclo-cross international de Marle
2006–2007
 1st Grand Prix van Hasselt, GvA Trofee
2009–2010
 1st Centrumcross Surhuisterveen
 1st Ciclocross del Ponte
2010–2011
 2nd National Cyclo-cross Championships
2011–2012
 1st Centrumcross Surhuisterveen

External links
 Official website

1975 births
Living people
Dutch male cyclists
Cyclo-cross cyclists
Dutch mountain bikers
Sportspeople from Tilburg
Cyclists from North Brabant
21st-century Dutch people